Phodoryctis is a genus of moths in the family Gracillariidae.

Species
Phodoryctis caerulea (Meyrick, 1912) 
Phodoryctis dolichophila (Vári, 1961)
Phodoryctis stephaniae Kumata & Kuroko, 1988
Phodoryctis thrypticosema (Vári, 1961)

External links
Global Taxonomic Database of Gracillariidae (Lepidoptera)

Acrocercopinae
Gracillarioidea genera